Honey Night is a 2015 Macedonian drama film directed by Ivo Trajkov. The film was selected as the Macedonian entry for the Best Foreign Language Film at the 88th Academy Awards but it was not nominated.

Cast
 Nikola Ristanovski as Nikola
 Verica Nedeska as Anna
 Igor Angelov as Andov
 Boris Damovski as Boris Pasternak
 Nina Janković as Nina
 Sabina Ajrula as Cveta

See also
 List of submissions to the 88th Academy Awards for Best Foreign Language Film
 List of Macedonian submissions for the Academy Award for Best Foreign Language Film

References

External links
 

2015 films
2015 drama films
Czech drama films
Macedonian-language films
Slovenian drama films